The Montenegrin Practical Shooting Association, Montenegrin Crnogorska Asocijacija Prakticnog Streljastva is the Montenegrin association for practical shooting under the International Practical Shooting Confederation.

External links 
 Official homepage of the Montenegrin Practical Shooting Association

References 

Regions of the International Practical Shooting Confederation
Practical Shooting
Sports organizations established in 2004